Datuk Mastura binti Mohd Yazid (Jawi مستورة بنت محمد يزيد; born 22 August 1962) is a Malaysian politician who served as the Deputy Minister in the Prime Minister's Department in charge of Special Functions for the second term in the Barisan Nasional (BN) administration under former Prime Minister Ismail Sabri Yaakob and former Minister Abdul Latiff Ahmad from August 2021 to the collapse of the BN administration in November 2022 and the first term in the Perikatan Nasional (PN) administration under former Prime Minister Muhyiddin Yassin and former Minister Mohd Redzuan Md Yusof from March 2020 to the collapse of the PN administration in August 2021 as well as the Member of Parliament (MP) for Kuala Kangsar from June 2016 to November 2022.

Education 
Mastura graduated with a Bachelor of Laws in Honors from the University of Kent, United Kingdom in 1984. The following year, she continued her studies at the Law School Education Law Council at the Inns of Court, London. 3 years later, she obtained a degree in Shariah Law and Practice at International Islamic University. In 2013, she received a Bachelor of Psychology in Open University of Malaysia.

Career 
Mastura began her career as an advocate and solicitor in 1986. She practiced law at her family's legal firm, Yazid Baba & Partners, run by her father Yazid Baba, the former Negeri Sembilan state assemblymen of Terentang (1974-1986). She has also been a translator since 2007.

Politics 
Mastura is a Member of the UMNO Women's Committee of the Telok Kemang Division, Negeri Sembilan. She often helps her husband Wan Mohammad Khair-il Anuar Wan Ahmad do charity work and dedicated to the people of Kuala Kangsar. In addition, Mastura is also active as a member of the Perak State Charity and Welfare Agency (BAIDURI).

Member of Parliament for Kuala Kangsar (2016–2022) 
In 2016, Mastura was elected as the MP of Kuala Kangsar after she successfully defended the seat in the by-election triggered by the death of the incumbent MP, who was also her husband. In the 2018 general election, she was re-elected once again albeit with a decreased majority. In 2022 general election, she was dropped by the party to contest and instead nominate caretaker Member of the Perak State Legislative Assembly (MLA) for Bukit Chandan Maslin Sham Razman for the Kuala Kangsar federal seat.

Deputy Minister in the Prime Minister's Department in charge of Special Functions (2020–2021 & 2021–2022) 
The 2020–2022 Malaysian political crisis overthrew the democratically elected Pakatan Harapan (PH) government in February 2020 and formed the Perikatan Nasional (PN) government in March 2020 led by Prime Minister Muhyiddin Yassin. Muhyiddin appointed Mastura as Deputy Minister in the Prime Minister's Department in charge of Special Functions on 10 March 2020. The PN government collapsed in August 2021, she lost the position as a result. The BN government led by Prime Minister Ismail Sabri Yaakob was then returned to replace the PN government, she was reappointed to the position by Ismail Sabri on 30 August 2021, along with many other ministers and deputy ministers in the PN government that were reappointed. As Mastura did not contest in the 2022 general election and stepping down as an MP, she also stepped down from the position and left the government.

Personal life 
Mastura is a widow of the late Wan Mohammad Khair-il Anuar Wan Ahmad. Her husband died on May 5, 2016 as a result of a helicopter crash in Sarawak.

Mastura is the mother of four sons - Wan Emir Astar, Wan Imar Izzat, Wan Iskandar and Wan Muhammad Ammar. Her eldest son, Wan Emir Astar was married with Malaysian actress and TV presenter named Mira Filzah.

Election results

Honour
  :
  Knight Commander of the Order of the Territorial Crown (PMW) – Datuk (2021)

External links

References

1962 births
Living people
People from Negeri Sembilan
Malaysian people of Malay descent
Malaysian Muslims
20th-century Malaysian lawyers
United Malays National Organisation politicians
Malaysian people of Minangkabau descent
Members of the Dewan Rakyat
Women members of the Dewan Rakyat
Women in Perak politics
Alumni of the University of Kent
21st-century Malaysian politicians
21st-century Malaysian lawyers
Malaysian women lawyers
21st-century Malaysian women politicians